Sebastián Andrés Bueno (born 24 October 1981) is an Argentine footballer who plays for Perugia.

Biography
Born in Junín, Buenos Aires, Bueno started his career at hometown club Sarmiento. In 2001–02 Apertura (opening) season, he was signed by top division club Banfield which also located in the Greater Buenos Aires. In the next season, he moved to Primera B Nacional side Quilmes. In the 2003 Apertura season (2003–04 "opening" season), he moved to league rival Unión de Santa Fe. In 2004, he moved to Chile for Primera División side La Serena, which is the Chilean "Apertura" season. He then returned to Argentina for San Martín de San Juan in Clausura 2005 and in March 2006 left for Brazilian side Inter de Limeira for Campeonato Paulista Série A2. In October 2006, he left for Italian Serie C2 side Catanzaro. Due to Bueno has EU nationality, he could able to sign by Italian lower division, which the lower divisions club could not signed a non-EU player from abroad. He scored 16 goals in the first season, but in the second season, he just scored 3 times before joined Benevento in January 2008.

In September 2011 he joined Perugia

International career
Bueno had call-up to 2001 FIFA World Youth Championship., because of an injury suffered by Chori Domínguez. He  won the Champion as unused member.

References

External links
 Profile at AIC.Football.it 
 futbolpasion.com
 
 

1981 births
Living people
Argentine footballers
Argentina under-20 international footballers
Argentine expatriate footballers
Argentine Primera División players
Club Atlético Sarmiento footballers
Club Atlético Banfield footballers
Quilmes Atlético Club footballers
Unión de Santa Fe footballers
Deportes La Serena footballers
San Martín de San Juan footballers
Associação Atlética Internacional (Limeira) players
U.S. Catanzaro 1929 players
Benevento Calcio players
Expatriate footballers in Chile
Expatriate footballers in Brazil
Expatriate footballers in Italy
Argentine expatriate sportspeople in Brazil
Argentine expatriate sportspeople in Italy
Association football forwards
People from Junín, Buenos Aires
Sportspeople from Buenos Aires Province